Chaos is a 2008 Hong Kong action thriller film directed by Herman Yau and starring Gordon Lam, Andrew Lin, Kristal Tin and Charmaine Fong.

Plot
In the Walled City, the inhabitants are either cornered or have a shady past. They commit prostitution, gambling, drugs and other lawless acts. They have their own order and law. The Walled City is akin to a "limbo" zone. One day, Cheung Tai-hoi (Andrew Lin), while escorting criminal Mickey Szeto (Gordon Lam), accidentally loses control of the police van and breaks into the Walled City and is detained by its inhabitants. Walled City's overlord Crow (Alexander Chan) hate the police and believes one of them is a cop and prepares to execute one of them. At this time, a brothel owner in Walled City, Ling, (Kristal Tin) falsely accuses Mickey to be the cop. Therefore, Hoi was released while Mickey was continued to be detained. It turns out that Mickey is Ling's long lost lover and she wants him to suffer since she believes he abandoned her and her daughter, Yan (Charmaine Fong), years ago. At the same time, she also wants Mickey to help her leave Walled City because Crow has been eyeing for Yan. Yan then sees the detained Mickey, while she does not know he is her father, she had a feeling which prompt her to decide to help him escape. At the same time, a fatal plague was discovered in Walled City and the government uses this as an excuse to start a massacre that would prevent the spreading of the plague. Will Mickey, Tai-hoi, Ling and Yan survive the massacre? Will Mickey and Yan be reunited as father and daughter?

Cast
Gordon Lam as Mickey Szeto
Andrew Lin as Cheung Tai-hoi
Kristal Tin as Ling
Charmaine Fong as Yan
Alexander Chan as Crow
 as Mr. Kim
Sam Wong as Inmate 2378
Wong Man-shing as Crow's Thug
Chan Man-ching as Crow's Thug
Lui Siu-ming as Crow's Thug
Chin Yiu-wing as Crow's Thug

External links

Chaos at Hong Kong Cinemagic

2008 films
2008 action thriller films
Hong Kong action thriller films
Police detective films
2000s Cantonese-language films
Films directed by Herman Yau
Films shot in Hong Kong
2000s Hong Kong films